Arroyo Grande (Spanish for "Big Creek") is a city in San Luis Obispo County, California, United States.  The population was 18,441 as of the 2020 census, up from 17,252 as of the 2010 Census.

History

The earliest inhabitants of the Arroyo Grande Valley were Chumash Indians, who conducted extensive trade with other Native American tribes at a considerable distance.

The first Europeans to see this stretch of coast were the crew of Portuguese explorer Juan Rodríguez Cabrillo (Cabrilho in Portuguese), working in the service of Spain. The Spanish Portolá expedition was the first European visit by land, passing through the area on September 4, 1769. When Mission San Luis Obispo de Tolosa was established nearby, the Portolà trail became part of the road connecting the 21 Spanish missions (today called El Camino Real). Later, agricultural activities expanded into the area. The Arroyo Grande Valley was found to have particularly fertile ground allowing a rich produce supply that continued to this day. The area was given a Spanish name that translates into multiple meanings, "Big Gulch", "Muddy Creek", "Big Ditch", Arroyo Grande was to become a prosperous and important ranch and farm community.

Francis Ziba Branch, originally from New York, saw the area on a hunting expedition during the period when California was part of Mexico.  Branch married María Manuela Carlón, and this marriage entitled Branch to file a claim for a Mexican land grant. In 1836 he, his wife, and infant son moved onto Rancho Santa Manuela. They were managing a successful cattle ranching operation when California became a U.S. territory, and then a U.S. state. Some years later, they suffered financial difficulties during a drought when many cattle died. They sold off smaller parcels of land to settlers.

In 1862, the San Luis Obispo Board of Supervisors established the township of Arroyo Grande. Businesses developed along a road called Branch Street to serve local agriculture. A railroad depot was built in 1882. The city of Arroyo Grande was incorporated on July 10, 1911.

Arroyo Grande experienced rapid growth in the 1970s and 1980s, partially due to the expansion of the wastewater treatment plant, under an EPA Clean Water Grant, that removed a growth constraint. This federal grant program required preparation of an Environmental Impact Report, which provided much of the initial environmental database for Arroyo Grande.

Geography

Arroyo Grande is a small coastal town with historic, suburban, and rural elements located at  (35.120878, -120.586799). 

Arroyo Grande is located in a coastal ecosystem within the California floristic province, and the native habitats include coast live oak woodland, central coastal scrub, willow and mixed riparian along Arroyo Grande Creek and numerous tributaries, native bunch-grass grassland, coastal prairie, dunes and intertidal zone, and non-native and agricultural areas.

It is one of the cities on the Central Coast known as the "Five Cities".  Which coastal communities are commonly thought of as being the Five Cities has changed over time, as population has grown and shifted geographically. Currently, Arroyo Grande, Grover Beach, Oceano, Pismo Beach, and Shell Beach are generally considered to make up the "Five Cities". However, the following cities are the original Five Cities: Grover Beach, previously known as Grover City, Fair Oaks (later annexed by Arroyo Grande), Arroyo Grande, Oceano, and Halcyon. Oceano is historically one of the Five Cities, even though it is considered a Community Service District. Shell Beach is part of Pismo Beach.

Climate
Arroyo Grande has a Temperate-Mediterranean climate (Köppen climate classification Csb).

Demographics

2010

At the 2010 census Arroyo Grande had a population of 17,252. The racial makeup of Arroyo Grande was 14,710 (85.3%) White, 156 (0.9%) African American, 125 (0.7%) Native American, 595 (3.4%) Asian, 14 (0.1%) Pacific Islander, 856 (5.0%) from other races, and 796 (4.6%) from two or more races. Hispanic or Latino of any race were 2,707 persons (15.7%).

The census reported that 17,078 people (99.0% of the population) lived in households, 62 (0.4%) lived in non-institutionalized group quarters, and 112 (0.6%) were institutionalized.

There were 7,087 households, 2,027 (28.6%) had children under the age of 18 living in them, 3,741 (52.8%) were opposite-sex married couples living together, 653 (9.2%) had a female householder with no husband present, 275 (3.9%) had a male householder with no wife present.  There were 346 (4.9%) unmarried opposite-sex partnerships, and 42 (0.6%) same-sex married couples or partnerships. 1,968 households (27.8%) were one person and 1,017 (14.4%) had someone living alone who was 65 or older. The average household size was 2.41. There were 4,669 families (65.9% of households); the average family size was 2.93.

The age distribution was 3,633 people (21.1%) under the age of 18, 1,193 people (6.9%) aged 18 to 24, 3,704 people (21.5%) aged 25 to 44, 5,229 people (30.3%) aged 45 to 64, and 3,493 people (20.2%) who were 65 or older. The median age was 45.4 years. For every 100 females, there were 92.6 males. For every 100 females age 18 and over, there were 88.4 males.

There were 7,628 housing units at an average density of 1,307.2 per square mile, of the occupied units 4,686 (66.1%) were owner-occupied and 2,401 (33.9%) were rented. The homeowner vacancy rate was 1.9%; the rental vacancy rate was 4.0%. 11,345 people (65.8% of the population) lived in owner-occupied housing units and 5,733 people (33.2%) lived in rental housing units.

2000

At the 2000 census, there were 15,851 people in 6,478 households, including 4,353 families, in the city. The racial makeup of the city was 88.45% White, 0.62% African American, 0.45% Native American, 3.08% Asian, 0.18% Pacific Islander, 3.77% from other races, and 3.45% from two or more races. Hispanic or Latino of any race were 11.17% of the population.

Of the 6,478 households 29.0% had children under the age of 18 living with them, 55.0% were married couples living together, 9.4% had a female householder with no husband present, and 32.8% were non-families. 27.3% of households were one person and 14.4% were one person aged 65 or older. The average household size was 2.41 and the average family size was 2.94.

The age distribution was 23.3% under the age of 18, 6.7% from 18 to 24, 25.1% from 25 to 44, 24.6% from 45 to 64, and 20.3% 65 or older. The median age was 42 years. For every 100 females, there were 88.9 males. For every 100 females age 18 and over, there were 84.5 males.

The median income for a household in the city was $48,236, and the median family income  was $55,494. Males had a median income of $41,304 versus $30,688 for females. The per capita income for the city was $24,311.  About 4.3% of families and 6.9% of the population were below the poverty line, including 6.8% of those under age 18 and 5.4% of those age 65 or over.

Government

Notable people
 Sally Jane Bruce - actress in The Night of the Hunter
 Zac Efron - actor
 Lou Ferrigno - TV and movie actor, best known for the title role in The Incredible Hulk
 Paul Flores - murderer of Kristin Smart
 Horace Grant - former professional basketball player
 Jordan Hasay - middle-distance runner
 Robert Hunter - lyricist and singer-songwriter
 Ken Napzok - broadcaster, comedian, author of Why We Love Star Wars: The Great Moments That Built a Galaxy Far, Far Away
 Rita Quigley - film actress
 Harry Shum Jr. - actor, dancer and choreographer
 Sheila Varian - breeder of Arabian horses
 Robin Ventura - former professional baseball player and manager of Chicago White Sox
 Jimy Williams - former baseball manager

See also
 Lopez Lake
 Arroyo Grande High School
 Cypress Ridge Golf Course

References

External links

 
 Arroyo Grande & Grover Beach Chamber Of Commerce

 
Cities in San Luis Obispo County, California
Incorporated cities and towns in California
Populated places established in 1862
1862 establishments in California